The Catalan language originated from Vulgar Latin in the Pyrenees Mountains between France and Spain. It diverged from the other Romance languages in the 9th century. At that time, Catalan spread quickly throughout the Iberian peninsula when the Catalan counts conquered Muslim territory. By the 11th century, the Catalan language was present in several feudal documents. Catalan was present throughout the Mediterranean by the 15th century. At that time, the city of Valencia was thriving.

In 1659, the Treaty of Pyrenees was signed, beginning a suppression of the Catalan language. Louis XIV issued a decree that prohibited the use of the Catalan language in Northern Catalonia. The repression continued during the French Revolution when the First French Republic prohibited the usage of Catalan in linguistic education. The repression continued until recently, when finally the French government in 2007 promoted the usage of Catalan publicly and in education.

In Spain, the usage of Catalan was also prohibited. In Francoist Spain, Catalan was prohibited in government and education. It was initially prohibited in mass media, but then allowed during the early 1950s. Nevertheless, the publishing of written works in Catalan continued. Since the death of Franco and the subsequent adoption of the Spanish constitutional monarchy, the Catalan language has been promoted.

Middle Ages

Early Middle Ages

By the 9th century, the Catalan language had developed from Vulgar Latin on both sides of the eastern end of the Pyrenees mountains (counties of Rosselló, Empúries, Besalú, Cerdanya, Urgell, Pallars and Ribagorça), as well as in the territories of the Roman province and later archdiocese of Tarraconensis to the south. From the 8th century on, the Catalan counts extended their territory southwards and westwards, conquering territories then occupied by Muslims, bringing their language with them.

This expansion quickened with the separation of the County of Barcelona from the Carolingian Empire in 988. By the 9th century, the Christian rulers occupied the northern parts of present-day Catalonia, usually termed "Old Catalonia", and during the 11th and 12th centuries they expanded their domains to the region north of the Ebro river, a land known as "New Catalonia". During the 13th century, the Catalans expanded to the Land of Valencia and across to the Balearic Islands and Alghero in Sardinia.

According to historian Jaume Villanueva (1756–1824), the first attested Catalan sentence is thought to be found in an 8th-century manuscript from Ripoll that has since been lost. It was a whimsical note in 10th- or early 11th-century calligraphy: Magister m[eu]s no vol que em miras novel ("my master does not want you to watch me, newbie").

Starting in the 9th century, several feudal documents (especially oaths and complaints) written in macaronic Latin began to exhibit elements of Catalan, with proper names or even sentences in Romance. For example, in the act of consecration of the cathedral of Urgell from 839 the toponymy exhibits clear Catalan traits, like apocope in Argilers < ARGILARĬUS, Llinars < LINĀRES, Kabrils < CAPRĪLES, and reduction of Latin clusters as in Palomera < PALUMBARĬA. Another text, from the early 11th century, exhibits the names of seven fruit trees:  Of special historical and linguistic importance is the Memorial of Complaints of Ponç I (ca. 1050–1060), featuring whole sentences in Romance. By the middle of the 11th century, documents written completely or mostly in Catalan begin to appear, like the Oath of Radulf Oriol (ca. 1028-1047), Complaints of Guitard Isarn, Lord of Caboet (ca. 1080–1095), and The Oath of Peace and Truce of Count Pere Ramon (1098). The hagiographic poem Cançó de Santa Fe from ca. 1054 is not considered one of the oldest Catalan texts because it is hard to tell if it is written in Catalan or Occitan, since its place of composition is unknown and it is difficult to assign it to one language or the other: the two languages were similar to each other at the time.

Catalan shares many features with Gallo-Romance languages, which are mostly located in France and Northern Italy. Old Catalan diverged from Old Occitan between the 11th and 14th centuries, although it was not until the 19th century that Catalan was formally considered a separate language by romanists, when in 1863 the German philologist Friedrich Christian Diez first put Catalan on the same level as the rest of the Romance languages, though still admitting a close relationship with Occitan.

Late Middle Ages
 
Catalan enjoyed a golden age during the Late Middle Ages, reaching a peak of maturity and cultural plenitude. Examples of this can be seen in the works of Majorcan polymath Ramon Llull (1232–1315), the Four Great Chronicles (13th-14th centuries), and the Valencian school of poetry which culminated in Ausiàs March (1397–1459).

By the 15th century, the city of Valencia had become the center of social and cultural dynamism, and Catalan was present all over the Mediterranean world. The belief that political splendor was correlated with linguistic consolidation was voiced through the Royal Chancery, which promoted a highly standardized language.

The outstanding novel of chivalry Tirant lo Blanc (1490), by Joanot Martorell, shows the transition from medieval to Renaissance values, something that can also be seen in the works of Bernat Metge and Andreu Febrer. During this period, Catalan was what Costa Carreras terms "one of the 'great languages' of medieval Europe". The flowering of the Renaissance was closely associated with the advent of the printing press, and the first book produced with movable type in the Iberian Peninsula was printed in Valencia in 1474: Trobes en llaors de la Verge maria ("Poems of praise of the Virgin Mary").

18th century to the present: France

After the Treaty of the Pyrenees, a royal decree by Louis XIV of France on April 2, 1700 prohibited the use of the Catalan language in present-day Northern Catalonia. The decree forbade use in any official document, under the threat of being invalidated.

Shortly after the French Revolution, the French First Republic prohibited official use of, and enacted discriminating policies against, the nonstandard languages of France (patois), such as Catalan, Breton, Occitan, Flemish, and Basque.

The deliberate process of eradicating non-French vernaculars in modern France and dismissing them as mere local and often strictly oral dialects was formalized with Abbé Grégoire's Report on the necessity and means to annihilate the patois and to universalize the use of the French language, which he presented on June 4, 1794 to the National Convention; thereafter, all languages other than French were officially banned in the administration and schools for the sake of linguistically uniting post-Bastille Day France.

To date, the French government continues its policy of recognizing French as the country's only official language. Nevertheless, on 10 December 2007, the General Council of the Pyrénées-Orientales recognized Catalan as one of its official the languages in Article 1 (a) of its Charte en faveur du Catalan and sought to promote it in public life and education.

Article 1: "The General Council of Pyrénées-Orientales officially recognizes, along with the French language, Catalan as a language of the department."
()."

18th century to the present: Spain

After the Nueva Planta Decrees, the use of Catalan in administration and education was banned in the Kingdom of Spain. The effect was limited on the society, upon the official survey the Statistics Office of the French Ministry of the Interior asked the prefects, in 1807, regarding the limits of the French language. The survey found that in Roussillon, almost only Catalan was spoken, and since Napoleon wanted to incorporate Catalonia into France, as happened in 1812, the consul in Barcelona was also asked. He declared that Catalan "is taught in schools, it is printed and spoken, not only among the lower class, but also among people of first quality, also in social gatherings, as in visits and congresses", indicating that it was spoken everywhere "with the exception of the royal courts". He also indicated that Catalan was spoken "in the Kingdom of Valencia, in the islands of Mallorca, Menorca, Ibiza, Sardinia, Corsica and much of Sicily, in the Vall d "Aran and Cerdaña".

It was not until the Renaixença that use of the Catalan language saw a resurgence. During the Second Spanish Republic (1931-1939) Catalan became the official language of Catalonia (alongside Spanish), being used extensively by the Generalitat, the Catalan institution of self-government.

In Francoist Spain (1939–1975), the use of Spanish in place of Catalan was promoted, and public use of Catalan was initially repressed and discouraged by official propaganda campaigns. The use of Catalan in government-run institutions and in public events was banned. During later stages of Francoist Spain, certain folkloric or religious celebrations in Catalan were allowed to resume and were tolerated. Use of Catalan in the mass media was initially forbidden, but beginning in the early 1950s, it was permitted in the theater. Publishing in Catalan continued throughout the Spanish State. There were attempts at prohibiting the use of spoken Catalan in public and in commerce, and all advertising and signage had to be in Spanish, as did all written communication in business.

Following the death of Franco in 1975 and the restoration of democracy under a constitutional monarchy, the use of Catalan increased significantly because of new affirmative action and subsidy policies. The Catalan language recovered its official status and is now used in politics, education and the media, including the newspapers Avui ("Today"), El Punt ("The Point"), Ara ("Now"), La Vanguardia and El Periódico de Catalunya (sharing content with El Periòdic d'Andorra, printed in Andorra); and the television channels of Televisió de Catalunya (TVC): TV3,  and Canal 33 (culture channel), Super3/3XL (cartoons channel) as well as a 24-hour news channel 3/24 and the sports channel Esport 3; in Valencia Canal Nou, 24/9 and Punt 2; in the Balearic islands IB3; in Catalonia there are also some private channels such as 8TV and Barça TV.

But, despite the spread of media in Catalan, democracy consolidated an asymmetric regime of bilingualism of sorts, wherein the Spanish government has employed a system of laws that favored Spanish over Cataln, which becomes the weaker of the two languages, and therefore, in the absence of other states where it is spoken, is doomed to extinction in the medium or short term. In the same vein, its use in the Spanish Congress is prevented, and it is prevented from achieving official status Europe, unlike less spoken languages such as Gaelic. In other institutional areas, such as justice, Plataforma per la Llengua has denounced Catalanophobia. The association Soberania i Justícia have also denounced it in an act in the European Parliament. It also takes the form of linguistic secessionism, originally advocated by the Spanish extreme right and which has finally been adopted by the Spanish government itself and state bodies.

References

Bibliography

External links 

 Chronology of the repression of the Catalan language in catalan language

Catalan language